Super Sonic TV was a music channel in Albania that broadcast music.

References

See also
Television in Albania

Defunct television networks in Albania